Digitization Project Translatio is a freely-available digital collection of 19th and 20th century periodicals in Arabic, Persian and Ottoman Turkish, created and maintained at the University of Bonn. The project started in 2013, with funding provided by the state government of North Rhine-Westphalia. The publications had been provided in collaboration with several German institutions, eventually being digitized at Bonn. 

The collection is considered a strong archive of Egypt-based periodicals. Some of the publications in the archive are also rare or hard to find. The project's website has been praised for being user-friendly, while use of German language in descriptions and metadata as well as lack of information on editors and authors has been described as the disadvantages.

Archive 
The archive covers between 1860 and 1945, and currently includes the following publications:

Persian
Daneshkada
Ayandeh
Danesh
Akhtar
Kaveh
Danesh (1910–1911)
Jangal (1917–1918)
Baba Shamal (1943–1947)
Tarbiyat (1896–1907)
Shokufeh (1913–1919)
Sur-e Esrafil (1907–1909)
Yadgar (1944–1949)
Seraj al Akhbar (1911–1919)
Sharq (1924–1932)
Bahar (1910–1922)
Habl al-Matin (1907–1908)
Sharafat (1896–1903)Sharaf (1882–1891)
Nashriya-i Madrasa-i Mubaraka-i Dar al-Funun-i Tabriz (1893–1894)Majlis (1906–1908)Nama-i farhangistan (1943–1947)Ruznama-yi Millati (1866–1870)

ArabicAd-DiyaAl-BayanAl-JamiaAt-TabibAz-ZuhurAl-MaʿrifaAl-MuqtatafAl-IrfanApolloAl-Katib al-misriAl-HurriyaRuh al-QudusAl-Ādab wa-l-FannAn-NibrasSahifat Dar al-UlumMagallat Kulliyat al-Adab bi-l-Gamiʿa al-MisriyaAl-FajrAr-RawiAl-Balagh al-UsbuʿiAd-Dunya al-MusawwaraMagallat Kulliyat al-Adab bi-l-Gamiʿat Faruq al-AwwalAl-FukahaAt-TahdhibAl-AhaliAl-AlamAl-Ahrar al-MusawwaraTurkishKadroShehbalDiyojenDemetAnadolu MecmuasıHikmetMuharrirGüleryüzAydedeEşrefHamiyetAşiyanKaragözDavulNahidAşiyanHer AyResimli AySevimli AyEnvâr-ı ZekâYarım AyHayatEnvâr-ı ZekâBoşboğaz ile güllabiÂyineKadınlık''

See also 
 Nashriyah
 List of digital library projects

References 

Digital library projects
University of Bonn